The 2019 Shoot Out (officially the 2019 BetVictor Snooker Shoot Out) was a professional ranking snooker tournament, taking place from 21 to 24 February 2019 at the Watford Colosseum in Watford, England. It was played under a variation of the standard rules of snooker, and it was the fourteenth ranking event of the 2018/2019 season.

Michael Georgiou was the defending champion, but he lost to Li Hang 28–45 in the second round.

Thepchaiya Un-Nooh won his first career ranking title, beating Michael Holt 1–0 (74–0) in the final. Un-Nooh's 139 break in the semi-final was the highest in the history of the Shoot Out.

Prize fund
The breakdown of prize money for this year is shown below:

 Winner: £32,000
 Runner-up: £16,000
 Semi-final: £8,000
 Quarter-final: £4,000
 Last 16: £2,000
 Last 32: £1,000
 Last 64: £500
 Last 128: £250 (prize money at this stage will not count towards prize money rankings)

 Highest break: £2,000
 Total: £146,000

The "rolling 147 prize" for a maximum break: £5,000

Tournament draw

Top half

Section 1

Section 2

Section 3

Section 4

Bottom half

Section 5

Section 6

Section 7

Section 8

Finals

Final

Notes

Century breaks 
Total: 4

 139  Thepchaiya Un-Nooh
 133  Luca Brecel
 132  Ricky Walden
 100  Martin Gould

References

2019
2019 in snooker
2019 in English sport
2019
February 2019 sports events in the United Kingdom